Brenda Schultz-McCarthy was the defending champion but did not compete that year.

Lindsay Davenport won in the final 6–4, 6–2 against Lisa Raymond.

Seeds
A champion seed is indicated in bold text while text in italics indicates the round in which that seed was eliminated. The top two seeds received a bye to the second round.

  Lindsay Davenport (champion)
  Amanda Coetzer (quarterfinals)
  Kimberly Po (semifinals)
  Lisa Raymond (final)
  Jennifer Capriati (quarterfinals)
  Amy Frazier (first round)
  Marianne Werdel-Witmeyer (second round)
  Patricia Hy-Boulais (first round)

Draw

Final

Section 1

Section 2

External links
 1997 IGA Classic Draw

1997 Singles
1997 WTA Tour